Oregon Highway 14 may refer to:

For the former OR 14, see Oregon Route 14.
For the unsigned Highway 14, see Crooked River Highway.
For the former unsigned Highway 14, see Shaniko-Mitchell Highway.

See also
Oregon Highway 140
Oregon Highway 141